Baiyin Road is a station on Line 11 of the Shanghai Metro.

References 
 

Railway stations in Shanghai
Line 11, Shanghai Metro
Shanghai Metro stations in Jiading District
Railway stations in China opened in 2009